The Soden Railway is a line in the western suburbs of Frankfurt am Main and was one of the oldest railways in Germany, opened in 1847.

Route 
The Soden Railway runs from Frankfurt-Höchst to Bad Soden am Taunus and is 6.6 km long. It was also called the Höchst–Soden Railway. The line has timetable route number 643 and is operated as line RB 11 of the Rhein-Main-Verkehrsverbund.

History 

The line was opened on 22 May 1847 and is might be described as the first German branch line. In Höchst it connects with the Taunus Railway opened in 1839 from Frankfurt to Wiesbaden. It was built to connect the emerging spa town of Soden to the new rail network. The builder and owner of the line was the Soden Company. The line was managed from the beginning by the Taunus Railway Company.

Since 1972, there has been a connection in Bad Soden to the Limes Railway to Niederhöchstadt, which connects Bad Soden with the Rhine-Main S-Bahn network.

Operations
The railway was originally only operated in the summer months. In 1860 the operating company stopped operations and demanded subsidies from the Nassau Government, which refused. Operations only resumed on 1 October 1863 after the track had been sold to the Taunus Railway Company for 100,000 guilders. On 1 January 1872 the Soden Railway was sold to the Prussian state railways and subsequently ran all year.

From 1979 to 1997 Soden Railway formed part of S-Bahn line S3. In addition, the line was electrified. Train patronage was very poor, so S-Bahn services were abandoned. From 1997, the Frankfurt-Königsteiner Eisenbahn operated the line. These operations have since been rebranded as Hessische Landesbahn (Hessian State Railways). Despite the fact that the line is electrified, it had been operated, along with the Hessische Landesbahn's other routes through the Taunus, by a diesel multiple unit for many years  (usually a LHB VT 2E, sometimes a LINT). Since 2019, the line has been operated by electrical multiple units (Alstom Coradia Continental)

Future 
The section south of the A 66 autobahn would from part of the proposed Regionalstadtbahn Regionaltangente West line through the western fringes of Frankfurt. If built, this would have a new station called Zuckschwerdtstraße.

Notes

References
Track data from 

Railway lines in Hesse
Railway lines opened in 1847
1847 establishments in Germany
Transport in Frankfurt
Buildings and structures in Main-Taunus-Kreis